Francisco Antonio Pérez Salas (1764 – November 10, 1828) was a Chilean political figure. He served several times as member of different Government Juntas, and participated actively in the war of independence in that country.

He was born in Santiago, the son of José Pérez García and of Ana Josefa Ramirez de Salas y Pavón. Pérez studied law and was admitted to practice in colonial Chile. He was a member of the Government Junta established on April 13, 1813, together with Agustín Eyzaguirre and José Miguel Infante. He was president of the junta between April 13 and August 23, and remained a member until October 9 of the same year. He is one of the founders of the National Library of Chile.

During the period of the Spanish Reconquista, he was arrested and imprisoned in Juan Fernández island. After the battle of Chacabuco he was set free, and became a member and later the regent of the Justice Chamber. He was elected a Senator in 1822 and died in Santiago in 1828.

References

1764 births
1828 deaths
Heads of state of Chile
Members of the Senate of Chile
People of the Chilean War of Independence
19th-century Chilean people
People from Santiago